Guxo! is a centre-right political party in Kosovo, formed on 5 November 2020 by Vjosa Osmani. In February 2022, Guxo was registered as a political party as up to that point it was a political list.

History 
The party presented candidates within the common list of Vetëvendosje in the 2021 Kosovan parliamentary election, and obtained seven deputies, including Vjosa Osmani. Two of its members joined the Second Kurti cabinet resulting from these elections, which caused the number of deputies from the party to fall from seven to five. After Osmani was elected President of Kosovo, she left the party as, according to the Constitution of Kosovo, the president has no right to exercise any other public office or to hold any office in a political party, dropping the number of Guxo deputies to four, while Donika Gërvalla-Schwarz became head of Guxo.

Leaders

Election results

References

External links 
 
 

2020 establishments in Kosovo
Political parties established in 2020
Political parties in Kosovo
Centrist parties in Kosovo